The Company of Watermen and Lightermen (CWL) is a historic City guild in the City of London. However, unlike the city's other 109 livery companies, CWL does not have a grant of livery. Its meeting rooms are at Waterman's Hall on St Mary at Hill, London.

The role of watermen was to transfer passengers, while lightermen moved goods and cargo, between the Port of London and vessels moored in the River Thames. Although modern river workers are licensed by the Maritime and Coastguard Agency, the Company continues its roles arranging apprenticeships, lobbying on river matters, and organising historic annual events and ceremonies.

The company's clerk is Julie Lithgow, formerly director of the Institute of Chartered Shipbrokers.

History

CWL was established in the medieval period to support and maintain rights of the river workers. The two main occupations were that of watermen and lightermen. The watermen transferred passengers across and along city centre rivers and estuaries. Most notable are those on the Thames and Medway. Other rivers such as the Tyne and Dee in Wales had watermen who formed guilds in medieval times. Lightermen transfer goods between ships and quays (including wharves, jetties and piers)they specifically loaded (originally 'laded') and unloaded ('alighted') the ships. Laded survives in the phrases bill of lading and fully laden)  In the Port of London they overwhelmingly used flat-bottomed barges, called lighters.

The King's Bargemaster and Royal Watermen are chosen from their number.

The company's centuries-spanning apprenticeship index is a popular genealogy source.

Annual race
The Doggett's Coat and Badge, which was first raced in 1715, is the oldest continuously-run river race. It claims to be the oldest continually staged annual sports event; though single sculls replaced the original skiffs or lighters. 

The winner's prize is a watermen's red coat plus a silver badge, displaying the White Horse of Hanover and the word "Liberty", in honour of George I's coronation. Each completing contestant of the six apprentice competitors receive a miniature of a Doggett's Badge for their lapel in a ceremony at Watermen's Hall, in silver for the winner and in bronze for the others. The Fishmongers' Company sponsors the awards, rewarding the rowing clubs of the top four with tiered prizes of £1,000, £600, £400, and £200.

Three public houses retain memorabilia of the race :
Doggett's Coat & Badge, south-side of Blackfriars Bridge close to The Shard, London SE1.
The Coat & Badge, Putney, London SW15.
The Doggett Coat and Badge, Margate, lower reaches of the Thames Estuary.

Swan Upping
Swan Upping is the practice by which the swans found on the river thames between Sunbury and Abingdon are caught, ringed, and released. The skiffs used for this practice by the King's Marker of the Swans are rowed by a team of oarsmen, from the Watermen and Lightermen.

The Tudor Pull
Every year the Thames Traditional Rowing Association organise a ceremony called the Tudor Pull, in which the Royal Barge Gloriana is escorted down the Thames by cutters, all crewed by the King's Barge Master and members of the Watermen & Lightermen Company. They transport 'The Stela' - a section of ancient wooden water pipe - from Hampton Court Palace to the Tower of London, where it is handed over to  the Duty Governor of the Tower and the Yeoman Warders.

Mayoral duties
Every June, since 1381, the company holds the Knollys Rose Ceremony when a well-dressed procession presents a fresh rose to the incumbent Lord Mayor of London at his official residence, the Mansion House. CWL also takes part in the annual Lord Mayor's Show.

Modern roles

CWL lobbies on river-related matters. It often works alongside the Passenger Boat Association, raising issues about jobs, legislation, and safety. The organisation negotiates with the UK government and its agencies. For example, in 2003 the Company of Watermen and Lightermen was given funding to provide assistance grants to apprentices from the riverside east London boroughs of Tower Hamlets and Newham.

Charitable work
In 1975 a linked charity, Transport on Water (TOW), was founded by members and people in public life. It aims to maintain the Thames and other waterways, including the Medway, as working rivers. It has organised The Thames Barge Driving Race since 1975.

See also
Maritime transport
Knollys Rose Ceremony
Free Watermen and Lightermen's Almshouses

References

External links
 Company website
 

Watermen and Lightermen
Grade II* listed livery halls